Gul Mohammed (February 15, 1957 – October 1, 1997) of New Delhi, India, according to Guinness World Records, was the shortest adult human being of his time whose existence and height have been independently verified.

On July 19, 1990, he was examined by Ram Manohar Lohia Hospital, New Delhi, India, and he stood 1 foot 10.5 inches (57 cm) tall and weighed 37.5 lbs (17 kg). He died on October 1, 1997, from respiratory complications and after a long struggle with asthma and bronchitis. His record was broken by Chandra Bahadur Dangi of Nepal whose height was just 21.5 inches (54.6 cm).

See also 
List of shortest people

References

1957 births
1997 deaths
People with dwarfism
20th-century Indian Muslims